Between February 1942 and November 1943, during the Pacific War of World War II, the Australian mainland, domestic airspace, offshore islands, and coastal shipping were attacked at least 111 times by aircraft from the Imperial Japanese Navy Air Force and Imperial Japanese Army Air Force. These attacks came in various forms; from large-scale raids by medium bombers, to torpedo attacks on ships, and to strafing runs by fighters.

In the first and deadliest set of attacks, 242 aircraft hit Darwin on the morning of 19 February 1942. Killing at least 235 people and causing immense damage, the attacks made hundreds of people homeless and resulted in the abandonment of Darwin as a major naval base.

These attacks were opposed by, and often aimed at, units and personnel from the Royal Australian Air Force (RAAF), Australian Army, Royal Australian Navy, United States Army Air Forces, United States Navy, British Royal Air Force and Royal Netherlands East Indies Air Force. Japanese aircrews also targeted civil infrastructure, including harbours, civil airfields, railways, and fuel tanks. Some civilians were also killed.

Although the main defence was provided by RAAF and Allied fighters, a number of Australian Army anti-aircraft batteries in northern Australia also defended against Japanese air raids.

Early Japanese air raids
The Japanese conducted a series of air raids on Australia during February and March 1942. These raids sought to prevent the Allies from using bases in northern Australia to contest the conquest of the Netherlands East Indies.

The first air raid on Darwin

The bombing of Darwin on 19 February 1942 was both the first and the largest attack mounted by Japan against mainland Australia, when four Japanese aircraft carriers (and ) launched a total of 188 aircraft from a position in the Timor Sea. These 188 naval aircraft inflicted heavy damage on Darwin and sank eight ships. A raid conducted by 54 land-based army bombers later the same day inflicted further damage on the town and RAAF Base Darwin and resulted in the destruction of 20 military aircraft. Allied casualties were 235 killed and between 300 and 400 wounded, the majority of whom were non-Australian Allied sailors. Only four Japanese aircraft (all navy carrier-borne) were confirmed to have been destroyed by Darwin's defenders.

The attack on Broome

On 3 March 1942, nine Japanese A6M2 Zero fighters attacked the town of Broome, in northern Western Australia. Although Broome was a small town, it had become a significant air base and route of escape for refugees and retreating military personnel, following the Japanese invasion of Java. During the attack, which consisted of strafing runs only by the Zeros, at least 88 Allied civilians and military personnel were killed and 24 aircraft were lost. As Broome was almost undefended, Japanese losses were light, with only a single Zero being shot down over Broome and another one failing to reach its base.

Attacks on north Queensland, July 1942

Japanese naval flying boats conducted four small air raids on the north Queensland city of Townsville and the town of Mossman in late July 1942. Townsville, which was an important military base, was raided by Japanese Kawanishi H8K1 "Emily" flying boats operating from Rabaul on three nights in late July 1942. On the night of 25/26 July, the city was attacked by two flying boats but did not suffer any damage as the six bombs dropped by these aircraft fell into the sea. Townsville was attacked for the second time in the early hours of 28 July when a single flying boat dropped eight bombs which landed in bushland outside the city. Six P-39 Airacobras unsuccessfully attempted to intercept the Japanese aircraft. The third raid on Townsville occurred in the early hours of 29 July when a single flying boat again attacked the city, dropping seven bombs into the sea and an eighth which fell on an agricultural research station at Oonoonba, damaging a coconut plantation. This aircraft was intercepted by four Airacobras and was damaged. The fourth raid on north Queensland occurred on the night of 31 July when a single flying boat dropped a bomb which exploded near a house outside of Mossman, injuring a child.

List of attacks by date

1942

February
19
 Bombing of Darwin
 (10:00) Attack by 188 carrier-based aircraft at Darwin, Northern Territory (NT)
 (11:55) Attack by 54 land-based high-level bombers at Darwin, NT
 Bathurst Island, NT
20
 (11:30) Off Cape Londonderry, Western Australia (WA). MV Koolama damaged by a Kawanishi H6K5 flying boat. Attacked again at 13:30 and severely damaged, with injuries to three passengers.
21
 Rulhieres Bay, WA (later known as Koolama Bay) Koolama attacked again, no damage or injuries.

March
3
 (09:20) Broome, WA. Attack on Broome: a strafing raid by nine A6M2 Zeros. At least 88 people were killed and 24 Allied aircraft were destroyed. A Sikh pilot of the Royal Indian Air Force Flying Officer Manmohan Singh, in one of the RAF Catalina flying boats died. He was the first Indian casualty on Australian soil. 
 (~10:30) Carnot Bay, WA. PK-AFV (Pelikaan)—a Douglas DC-3 airliner owned by KLM—was shot down by Zeros returning from the attack on Broome. Four passengers were killed. Diamonds worth £150,000–300,000 were lost or stolen following the crash.
 Wyndham, WA. Strafing attack by Zeroes. No casualties. Koolama, which is in port by this time (see above), sinks as an indirect result of the attack.
 Wyndham Airfield, WA
4
 Wreckage and passengers from PK-AFV attacked again by a Kawanishi H6K5 flying boat, no damage or casualties.
 (14:00) Darwin RAAF Airfield, NT
14
 Horn Island, Queensland (Qld)
15 
Darwin, NT. Sgt. Albert Cooper, 28, (RAF, 54 Squadron) from Wolverhampton, Staffordshire, England, shot down, and killed, in his Spitfire over Darwin harbour
16
 (13:30) Darwin RAAF Airfield and Bagot, NT
17
 Darwin, NT
18
 Horn Island, Qld
19
 (11:40) Darwin (Myilly Point and Larrakeyah), NT
20
 Broome Airfield, WA. Attack by Mitsubishi G4M2 "Betty" medium bombers. One civilian killed. Minor damage to airfield.
 Derby, WA
22
 (00:51) Darwin, NT
22
 Katherine, NT. One civilian killed. (Furthest air raid into the Australian interior – over 200 km from the coast).
23
 Darwin, NT
 Wyndham, WA (two raids)
28
 (12:30) Darwin RAAF Airfield, NT
30
 (05:40?) Darwin RAAF Airfield, NT
30
 Darwin RAAF Airfield, NT
31
 (13:20) Darwin RAAF Airfield, NT
 (22:19) Darwin RAAF Airfield, NT

April
2
 (15:30) Darwin (Harvey St, McMinn St, Shell Oil Tanks), NT
 Sattler Airfield, NT
4
 (13:48) Darwin Civil Airfield and Parap Hotel, NT
5
 (12:29) Darwin RAAF Airfield, NT
25
 (14:00) Darwin RAAF Airfield, NT
27
 (12:07) Darwin RAAF Airfield, NT
30
 Horn Island, QLD

June
13
 (11:52) Darwin RAAF Airfield, NT
14
 (13:14) Darwin (town area), NT
15
 (12:20) Darwin (Larrakeyah to Stokes Hill), NT
16
 (12:01) Darwin (town area), NT
26
 (20:50) Darwin, NT

July
7
 Horn Island, Qld
25
 (20:50) Darwin (town area), NT
26
 Townsville, Qld
 (21:39–22:54) Darwin (Vesteys Meatworks), NT
27
 (22:27) Knuckey's Lagoon, Darwin RAAF Airfield, NT
28
 (00:45) Darwin RAAF airfield, NT
 Townsville, Qld
29
 (00:59) Darwin (town area) and Knuckey's Lagoon, NT.
 Townsville, Qld
30
 (03:58) Darwin (town area) and Darwin RAAF Airfield, NT
 Horn Island, Qld
 Port Hedland, WA.
31
 Mossman, Qld
 (13:33) Darwin RAAF Airfield, NT

August
1
 Horn Island, Qld
21
 Wyndham, WA
23
 (12:12) Hughes Airfield, NT
24
 (21:24) Darwin RAAF Airfield, NT
 (22:14) Noonamah, NT
25
 (00:05) Darwin and Parap, NT
27
 (03:45–05:37) Darwin (Botanical Gardens) and Cox Peninsula, NT
28
 (03:35) Darwin (Railway Yards and Port Patterson), NT
30
 (02:39) Darwin (town area), NT
31
 (05:14) Darwin (town area) and Cox Peninsula), NT

September
25
 (03:41) Darwin (town area) and Knuckey's Lagoon, NT
25
 (05:48) Darwin (town area and Daly Street Bridge), NT
26
 (05:22) Livingstone Airfield, NT
27
 (04:56) Bynoe Harbour, NT
 (05:44) Darwin (town area) (Frances Bay)

October
10
 Horn Island, Qld
24
 (04:42) Batchelor Airfield
 (04:52) Pell Airfield
 (04:57) Cox Peninsula
 (05:12) Darwin RAAF Airfield, NT
25
 (05:30) Darwin (town area) and Darwin RAAF Airfield, NT
26
 (04:54) Darwin (town area) and Darwin RAAF Airfield, NT
27
 (02:20) Darwin (town area) and Darwin RAAF Airfield, NT

November
23
 (03:00–04:39) Darwin (town area) and Darwin RAAF Airfield, NT
 Coomalie Creek Airfield, NT
26
 (03:20) Darwin (town area), Strauss Airfield and Hughes Airfield, NT
27
 (03:56–04:46) Coomalie Creek, Hughes Airfield and Strauss Airfield, NT

1943

January
20
 (22:44–00:15) Searchlight station, AWC Camp, Ironstone, NT
21
 (21:54) Darwin (Frances Bay), NT
22
 (13:30)  sunk, near Wessel Islands, NT.

March
2
 (14:34) Coomalie Creek Airfield, NT
15
 (11:20) Darwin (oil tanks), NT

May

2
 (10:15) Darwin RAAF Airfield and Darwin Floating Dock, NT
9
 Millingimbi, NT
10
 Millingimbi, NT. The cutter  was sunk.
20
 Exmouth Gulf, WA
21
 Exmouth Gulf, WA
28
 Millingimbi, NT

June
18
 Horn Island, Qld
20
 (10:43) Winnellie and Darwin RAAF Airfield, NT
28
 (11:07) Vesteys, NT
30
 (12:30) Fenton Airfield, NT

July
6
 (12:02) Fenton Airfield, NT

August
13
 (21:45) Fenton Airfield, NT
 (23:12) Fenton Airfield and Coomalie Creek Airfield, NT
 (23:42) Coomalie Creek Airfield, NT
14
 Long Airfield, NT
17
 Port Hedland, WA
21
 (00:37) Fenton Airfield and Coomalie Creek Airfield, NT
 (03:30) Pell Airfield, NT

September
15
 (00:25) Fenton Airfield and Long Airfield, NT
15
 Onslow, WA. 
16
 Exmouth Gulf, WA (The southernmost air raid in Australia.)
18
 (03:50) Fenton Airfield and Long Airfield, NT
27
 Drysdale River Mission (Kalumburu) airfield, WA. Six fatalities; Father Thomas Gil, the superior of the mission, and five Aboriginal Australians.

November
10
 Coomalie Creek Airfield, NT
12
 (03:53–05:30) Parap, Adelaide River and Batchelor Airfield, NT

See also 
 3rd Air Group
 Takao Air Group
 No. 1 Wing RAAF
 Military history of Australia during World War II
 Battle for Australia

Notes

References

 
Lewis, Tom. (2003). A War at Home. A Comprehensive guide to the first Japanese attacks on Darwin. Tall Stories, Darwin.

External links
ozatwar.com, "Japanese Air Raids in Australia During WW2"
diggerhistory.info "Attacks on the Australian mainland in WW2"
Australian War Memorial, "Air raids on Australian mainland – Second World War"
Darwin Defenders 1942–45 Inc, veterans association's list of 43 air raids (excluding reconnaissance flights)
Kalumburu Community-ABC Open, "The secret bombing of Australia"

Conflicts in 1942
Conflicts in 1943
Military attacks against Australia
South West Pacific theatre of World War II
Aerial bombing operations and battles of World War II
1942 in Australia
1943 in Australia
Military history of Australia during World War II
World War II aerial operations and battles of the Pacific theatre
Australia–Japan military relations